The Wiggins Formation is a geologic formation in Wyoming. It preserves fossils dating back to the Paleogene period.

See also

 List of fossiliferous stratigraphic units in Wyoming
 Paleontology in Wyoming

References
 

Paleogene geology of Wyoming

Lithic and Chemical Compositions of Samples from the Wiggins and Tepee Trail Formations, Southern Absaroka Range, Wyoming., Keith Brindley Ketner and Frederick S Fisher., USGS Open File Report 78-223